Willy Geurts (born 30 January 1954) is a Belgian footballer. He played in six matches for the Belgium national football team from 1978 to 1982.

References

External links
 

1954 births
Living people
Belgian footballers
Belgium international footballers
Place of birth missing (living people)
Association footballers not categorized by position